Mogamulizumab, sold under the brand name Poteligeo, is a humanized, afucosylated monoclonal antibody targeting CC chemokine receptor 4 (CCR4). The  U.S. Food and Drug Administration (FDA) approved it in August 2018 for treatment of relapsed or refractory mycosis fungoides and Sézary disease.  It was approved in Japan in 2012, for the treatment of relapsed or refractory CCR4+ adult T-cell leukemia/lymphoma (ATCLL) and in 2014, for relapsed or refractory CCR4+ cutaneous T cell lymphoma (CTCL).  The latter approval was based on study with 28 subjects.

The precursor to mogamulizumab was a mouse anti-human CCR4 IgG1 mAb (KM2160), that was made in 1996 in a collaboration between Kouji Matsushima of University of Tokyo and Kyowa Hakko Kirin.  Kyowa humanized it, and expressed the humanized gene in a CHO cell line in which FUT8 had been knocked out, which produced antibodies with no fucose in the Fc region.  This is thought to enhance its antibody-dependent cell-mediated cytotoxicity.  It was first tested in humans in 2007.

Kyowa licensed rights for use outside of cancer to Amgen in 2008, for $100 million up front and $420 million in biodollars. Amgen ran a Phase I study to explore its use in asthma.  Amgen terminated the agreement in 2014.

As of 2014, there were reports that mogamulizimab can cause serious skin rashes and some cases of Stevens–Johnson syndrome.

In 2017, the US FDA granted it a priority review for CTCL.  Full approval was granted in August 2018. The U.S. Food and Drug Administration (FDA) considers it to be a first-in-class medication.

Research 
Mogamulizumab is being explored as a treatment for HTLV-1–Associated Myelopathy. An early Phase 1-2a study showed decreased in proviral loads, as well as inflammatory markers in the CSF. 79% of the patients showed reduction in spasticity and 32% showed decrease in motor disability.

References

External links 
 
 
 

Monoclonal antibodies
Orphan drugs